Diminishment is the legal process by which the United States Congress can reduce the size of an Indian reservation.

History
In 1984, the United States Supreme Court held in Solem v. Bartlett, 465 U.S. 463 (1984), that "only Congress may diminish the boundaries of an Indian reservation, and its intent to do so must be clear." This was noted in the Court's 2016 case Nebraska v. Parker, 577 U.S. ___ (2016), in which the Court held that an 1882 Act passed by Congress did not diminish the Omaha Reservation.

The Solem case established a "diminishment doctrine" that U.S. courts could use when evaluating whether diminishment had taken place.

In the 1994 case Hagen v. Utah, 510 U.S. 399 (1994), the Supreme Court held that Congress's 1902 Act had diminished the Uintah Reservation. The Court applied its doctrine established in the Solem case.

See also 
 Dawes Act
 Curtis Act
 Checkerboarding (land)
 Diminished value
 Diminished responsibility
 Off-reservation trust land
 Land Buy-Back Program for Tribal Nations
 Eminent domain in the United States
 Indian old field

Notes
Diminishment commonly refers to the reduction in size of a reservation. A finding of diminishment generally suggests that a discrete, easily identifiable parcel of land has been removed from reservation status.

References 

Legal terminology
American Indian reservations
Aboriginal title in the United States
United States federal Indian policy